Neumi Nanuku (born 20 June 1976 in Burenitu, Nalawa) is a Fijian rugby union footballer, je plays as a fullback.

Nanuku is 5 feet 9 (175 cm) tall and weighs . He grew up in the Nalawa and he played for Nadroga in the National Provincial Rugby Tournament in Fiji.

Fiji Sevens
A member of the 2005 World Cup 7s winning squad, Nanuku stamped his mark as one of the predators of the 2005-06 IRB Sevens World Series.

After coming on in the Wellington Sevens final against South Africa, Nanuku sprinted the length of the pitch to score the winning try in extra-time.

One of Nadroga's heroes of 2004 after the resounding victories in the Telecom Fiji Cup and Sullivan-Farebrother Trophy. Overlooked for the 2004 Colonial Cup, Nanuku still finished the season as top try scorer in Fiji with 12.

Nanuku debuted for Fiji alongside Nadroga team-mates Mosese Volavola, Dale Tonawai and Isoa Neivua, and although his first game against the NZ Divisional XV was less than perfect, he made an improved performance a week later in Lautoka to restore some confidence.

He was then selected into the Fiji sevens team for Dubai and South Africa and later short-listed for IRB Sevens Player of the Year.

He would miss the next two Leg of the series due to an injury. Nanuku had a knee operation and this will keep him out of playing at the two tournaments.

Europe
Nanuku signed to play in the Top 14 rugby competition for the Castres for the 2007-08 Top 14 season for one season and the following year, he signed on for Dax rugby team.

Fiji tests 
 Test debut: 2005 v Portugal in Lisbon
 1 cap (5 games)

References 

1976 births
Living people
Fijian rugby union players
US Dax players
Rugby union wings
Fijian expatriate rugby union players
Expatriate rugby union players in France
Fijian expatriate sportspeople in France
Fiji international rugby sevens players
Male rugby sevens players
People from Ra Province
I-Taukei Fijian people
Commonwealth Games medallists in rugby sevens
Commonwealth Games bronze medallists for Fiji
Rugby sevens players at the 2006 Commonwealth Games
Commonwealth Games rugby sevens players of Fiji
Fiji international rugby union players
Medallists at the 2006 Commonwealth Games